Kevin Clark (born 1950) is an American poet and critic, author of the poetry collections In the Evening of No Warning and Self-Portrait with Expletives.

Early life
Kevin grew up in New York City and now lives in San Luis Obispo, California, with his wife, Amy Hewes. He holds a PhD in English and an MA in Creative Writing, both from the University of California at Davis, and a BA in English from the University of Florida. He teaches Creative Writing and Literature at Cal Poly in San Luis Obispo and at the Rainier Writing Workshop Low Residency MFA Program in Tacoma, Washington.

The author of two full-length poetry collections, three chapbooks, and a textbook on poetry writing, Clark has published poetry and nonfiction in numerous periodicals, including The Southern Review, Antioch Review, Crazyhorse, Denver Quarterly, The Georgia Review, Gulf Coast, Iowa Review, and Ploughshares.

Awards
 Lena-Miles Wever Todd Poetry Book Prize from Pleiades Press, for Self-Portrait with Expletives (judge: Martha Collins)
 Angoff Award from The Literary Review

Published works
 Self-Portrait with Expletives (Pleiades Press/LSU Press, 2010)
 In the Evening of No Warning (New Issues Poetry & Prose, 2002)
 One of Us (Mille Grazie Press, 2000; chapbook)
 Widow under New Moon (Owl Creek Press, 1990; chapbook)
 Granting the Wolf (State Street Press, 1984; chapbook)
 The Mind's Eye: A Guide to Writing Poetry (Longman, 2007)

References

External links
Poets & Writers Entry on Kevin Clark
Article from the San Luis Obispo Tribune
Louisiana State University Press Page: Self-Portrait with Expletives
Pearson Longman Page: The Mind's Eye: A Guide to Writing Poetry
Review of In the Evening of No Warning
Bio at Ploughshares
Poem on the Academy of American Poets Website
Author Page at New Issues Poetry & Prose
Author's Website

American male poets
Living people
1950 births
Chapbook writers
University of California, Davis alumni